Hans-Dieter Tippenhauer (16 October 1943 – April 2021) was a German football manager.

References

1943 births
2021 deaths
People from Suwałki County
Sportspeople from Podlaskie Voivodeship
People from East Prussia
German football managers
Fortuna Düsseldorf managers
Arminia Bielefeld managers
Borussia Dortmund managers
Bundesliga managers
West German football managers
KFC Uerdingen 05 managers
Sportspeople from Dortmund